Henry Hammersley Travers (1844 – 16 February 1928) was a New Zealand naturalist, professional collector and taxidermist. He was the son of the politician William Travers.

Born in Hythe, Kent, England, in 1844, and baptised at Cheriton, Kent, on 13 October of that year, Travers was the son of William Thomas Locke Travers and Jane Travers (née Oldham). The family emigrated to New Zealand by the ship Kelso in 1849. Travers was educated at Nelson College from 1856 to 1860.

Specimens collected by Travers are in the collection of the Museum of New Zealand Te Papa Tongarewa.

Travers collected some of the last known specimens of Lyall's wren, selling them to the Colonial Museum (now Te Papa), Otago Museum and Walter Rothschild.

Travers died in Wellington on 16 February 1928.

Species
The following species and one genus were named in his honour:
Veronica traversii
Petroica traversi (Black robin)Pimelea traversiiPseudowintera traversiiTraversia lyalli'' (Lyall's wren)

Bibliography
Travers, Henry Hammersley. Notes on the Chatham Islands (lat. 44° 30' S.,long. 175° W.) The Journal of the Linnean Society. Botany. (1867) 9:135–144.

References

1844 births
1928 deaths
New Zealand naturalists
Taxidermists
People from Hythe, Kent
English emigrants to New Zealand
People educated at Nelson College